The Hakari is a left tributary of the Aras in Azerbaijan, geographically located in the Armenian Highlands.

Its largest tributary is the Vorotan (called Bazarchay in Azerbaijan), which joins the Hakari in its lowermost section. 

Several populated places are along the river, like Aganli (on the left bank), Alibayli (on the right bank), Mammadbayli (on the left bank) and Yenikend (on the right bank).
The river's water is used for irrigation and drinking. Fishes like trout and Arctic cisco spawn in this river.

References 

Rivers of Azerbaijan
Qubadli District
Zangilan District
Rivers of the Republic of Artsakh